CFWH-FM is a Canadian radio station, broadcasting at 94.5 MHz FM in Whitehorse, Yukon. The station broadcasts the programming of the CBC Radio One network known as CBC North. Until its closure in 2012, CFWH's sister television station was CFWH-TV.

History

CFWH began broadcasting on February 24, 1944 as a radio station owned and operated by the Northwest Service Command of the United States Army Service Forces, the entity then responsible for maintenance of the Alaska Highway. The station was staffed by members of the United States Army, with programming furnished by the Special Services. By December of 1945, a temporary landline connection to CJCA in Edmonton allowed for a relay of the CBC's Christmas Day programming that year.

Concurrent with the transfer of control of the Alaska Highway within Canada, on June 1, 1946, ownership of the station was transferred to the Canadian Army, Northwest Highway System. Most programming, however, continued to be supplied by the Armed Forces Radio Service, while volunteers from the Royal Canadian Air Force and the community at-large operated the station.

The Armed Forces Radio Service stopped deliveries of programming to CFWH in November of 1952. Around the same time, the CBC began distributing recordings of CBC radio programming to remote radio stations within Canada, including CFWH. These recordings were made in Montreal and originally on disc, but soon transitioned to tape by April of 1953. For CFWH, this meant that the station was able to obtain CBC programming on a consistent basis for the first time in its history. Initially, approximately 25 hours per week of said programming aired alongside local programming.

In 1956, the station's studios and transmitter were moved to a site at RCAF Station Whitehorse. By this time, the station was airing approximately 60 hours per week of CBC programming, most of which was about two weeks old by the time it arrived on tape in Whitehorse. 

In 1958, the CBC announced the creation of a northern radio service and that the volunteer operation of CFWH would be taken over by employees of the CBC. The transfer of control occurred on November 9, 1958, with CFWH becoming the first station within the new northern service. As part of the takeover, a direct link—via the CN Telegraph system—to the Trans-Canada Network was established in order for CFWH to obtain CBC programming.

The CFWH studios were moved in 1959 to a new facility on Third Avenue in downtown Whitehorse, where they remain to this day.

In conjunction with a transmitter power increase from 250 watts to 1,000 watts, CFWH moved off of its original 1240 kHz frequency and began broadcasting at 570 kHz on October 2, 1963.

On May 21, 2009, the CBC applied to the CRTC to convert CFWH to 94.5 MHz. The station received approval on October 27, 2009. The FM frequency was launched on June 1, 2009, and the AM frequency was shut down on August 31, 2012.

On September 12, 2012, the CBC received CRTC approval to add a new FM transmitter in Whitehorse to rebroadcast CFWH-FM on 95.3 MHz, due to the area's mountainous terrain causing signal deficiencies in part of the station's broadcast area. The callsign is CFWH-FM-1.

Local programming
CFWH produces all of CBC Radio's local programs in the Yukon, including A New Day on weekday mornings, the noon-hour program Midday Cafe, Airplay in the afternoons, and The Weekender on weekend mornings.

The station also produces Rencontres, a weekly French program for the Franco-Yukonnais community which airs in the network's Saturday afternoon block for local cultural programming. Although Whitehorse itself is served by a community-owned rebroadcaster of the Première station from Vancouver, that network does not originate any French programming in the Yukon.

Rebroadcasters
CFWH has the following rebroadcasters:

CBDN was a radio station which operated from the 1940s to the 1960s as CFYT.

On December 21, 2012, the CBC filed an application to convert CBDC 1230 to 104.9 MHz. The application was approved on May 8, 2013.

The CBC used to operate low-power rebroadcasters CBDD 560 Elsa and CBDX 970 Swift River; these rebroadcasters were closed at the CBC's request by the CRTC on October 25, 2013.

Community-owned rebroadcasters
The following rebroadcasters are not owned by the CBC, but by independent community groups.

On June 22, 2017, the CRTC approved the application by Noah Gehmair, in his capacity as Manager, Technology Infrastructure, Government of Yukon. The RDU will rebroadcast the signal of CFWH to the community of Mount Jubilee in order to provide Radio One programming to that community. The undertaking will distribute the programming service of CFWH at 103.1 MHz with an average effective radiated power (ERP) of 340 watts (maximum ERP of 482 watts with an effective height of antenna above average terrain of 271.45 metres). Manager, Technology Infrastructure, Government of Yukon reapplied to operate an FM transmitter at 103.1 MHz in Mount Jubilee on November 13, 2019. The proposed stations' call sign will be CKZV. This application to add an FM transmitter at Mount Jubilee was approved on June 3, 2020.

References

External links
 CBC North
 CFWH-FM history - Canadian Communications Foundation
 
 
 

Fwh
Fwh